The City of Sacramento and the Sacramento metropolitan area are home to one major league professional team — the Sacramento Kings of the NBA — and numerous minor league and amateur sports teams.  Sacramento also has recreational facilities.

Professional sports
Sacramento is home to the Sacramento Kings of the National Basketball Association. The Kings relocated to Sacramento from Kansas City in 1985.

On January 21, 2013, a 65% controlling interest of the Sacramento Kings was sold to Seattle-based investor, Chris Hansen. Hansen intended to move the franchise to Seattle for the 2013–2014 NBA season; the team was to be renamed the Seattle SuperSonics pending the approval of the sale and relocation by the NBA.  On February 6, 2013, NBA Commissioner David Stern stated the Seattle ownership group had filed with the NBA for franchise relocation. Sacramento Mayor Kevin Johnson fought the move, forming an ownership group led by Vivek Ranadive which wanted to keep the Kings in Sacramento. On May 16, 2013, the NBA Board of Governors met to vote on the move. The final vote was 22-8 in favor of the Kings staying in Sacramento.

Sutter Health Park (then known as Raley Field) hosted a minor league hockey game between the Stockton Heat and the Bakersfield Condors of the American Hockey League on December 18, 2015.

In 2000, AAA minor league baseball returned to Sacramento with the Sacramento River Cats, an affiliate of the San Francisco Giants. The River Cats play at Sutter Health Park, located in West Sacramento.

Former pro teams
The now defunct Sacramento Monarchs of the Women's National Basketball Association were one of the eight founding members of the WNBA, which started in 1997. The Monarchs won the WNBA Championship in 2005 to become the first major, professional sports team in Sacramento to do so. However, the Monarchs team folded in November 2009.

The Sacramento Solons, a minor league baseball team of the Pacific Coast League, played in Sacramento during several periods (1903, 1905, 1909–1914, 1918–1960, 1974–1976), mostly at Edmonds Field.

The Sacramento Express played at Bonney Field (now named Papa Murphy's Park) and began play in the only PRO Rugby season before the league folded.

In the past, the city hosted three professional football teams, the Sacramento Surge of the World League of American Football (who won the World Bowl II on June 6, 1992), the Sacramento Gold Miners of the Canadian Football League, and the Sacramento Attack of the Arena Football League.

Semi-pro and amateur sports

Teams in several smaller leagues have been and continue to be in Sacramento. The Sacramento Heatwave of the American Basketball Association currently plays at Folsom High School.

Sacramento was also home to an indoor soccer team, the Sacramento Knights of the Continental Indoor Soccer League (later called the World Indoor Soccer League).  The Sacramento XSV (pronounced "excessive") of the National Professional Paintball League represents the City but is based in Modesto, California. The last sports team to come to Sacramento was the Sacramento Mountain Lions which was part of the United Football League (2009). They played at Raley Field, home of the Sacramento River Cats.

Sacramento hosted the 2000 and 2004 USA Olympic Track & Field Trials. The California International Marathon (est. 1983) finishes in front of the Capitol, and attracts a field of international elite runners who vie for a share of the $50,000 prize purse. The fast point-to-point course begins in Folsom and is popular for runners seeking to achieve a Boston Marathon qualifying time and fitness runners. The Sacramento Mile is a national flat-track motorcycle racing event.  From 1961 to 1980, Sacramento hosted the Camellia Bowl, which selected or helped select ten national champions in college football's lower divisions.

College and high school sports
The Sacramento area is home to two NCAA Division 1 sports programs —  Sacramento State, which fields 21 varsity sports, most in the Big Sky Conference; and UC Davis, which fields 23 varsity teams, most in the Big West Conference.

Sacramento has frequently hosted the NCAA Men's Outdoor Track and Field Championship as well as the 1st and 2nd rounds of the NCAA Men's Division I Basketball Championship.

Sacramento is a hotbed for high school rugby. Jesuit High has won national championships, winning six times in total. Their arch-rival school Christian Brothers has come in second nationwide.  Granite Bay, Burbank, Del Campo, Sierra Foothills, and Vacaville have also placed well in the national competition over the years. The Sacramento Valley High School Rugby Conference hosts the largest and arguably deepest preseason youth and high school rugby tournament in America.

Recreation
Sacramento hosts some recreational facilities and events. It attracts cyclists and equestrians from across the state. The California State Fair is held in Sacramento each year at the end of the summer, ending on Labor Day. In 2010, the State Fair moved to July. More than one million people attended this fair in 2001.

Among other recreational options in Sacramento is Discovery Park, a  park studded with stands of mature trees and grasslands. This park is situated where the American River flows into the Sacramento River.

In amateur sports, Sacramento claims many prominent Olympians such as Mark Spitz, Debbie Meyer, Mike Burton, Summer Sanders, Jeff Float (all swimming), and Billy Mills (track). Coach Sherm Chavoor founded his world famous Arden Hills Swim Club just east of the city and trained Burton, Myer, Spitz and others.

References

 
Sacramento, California
Sports in Sacramento County, California
Sacramento metropolitan area